Collaborations is a compilation album by American singer Jill Scott, released on January 30, 2007, by Hidden Beach Recordings. The album consists of past collaborations between Scott and other artists, in addition to two remixes of "Love Rain" featuring Mos Def. The CD release is accompanied by a Hidden Beach sampler including two Scott songs, "In Stereo" and the live version of "The Fact Is (I Need You)".

Track listing

Personnel
Credits adapted from the liner notes of Collaborations.

 Jill Scott – vocals 
 Vidal Davis – production ; additional production 
 Craig Kallman – production 
 I Monster – additional production 
 Bobby Colomby – production 
 Andre Harris – production 
 will.i.am – production 
 Jay Dee – production 
 James Poyser – production 
 Junius Bervine – production 
 Jeff Townes – production 
 Darren "Limitless" Henson – production 
 John Burk – production 
 Kirk Franklin – production

Charts

Weekly charts

Year-end charts

References

2007 compilation albums
Albums produced by Bobby Colomby
Albums produced by Craig Kallman
Albums produced by Dre & Vidal
Albums produced by J Dilla
Albums produced by James Poyser
Albums produced by Jimmy Jam and Terry Lewis
Albums produced by will.i.am
Alternative hip hop compilation albums
Hidden Beach Recordings albums
Jill Scott (singer) compilation albums